The following is an incomplete list of paintings by Adriaen Coorte that are generally accepted as autograph by Laurens J. Bol and other sources. The list is in order of creation, starting from the 1680s when Adriaen began painting scenes after his teacher Melchior d'Hondecoeter in Amsterdam. In the mid 1680s he moved to Middelburg, where his paintings can still be found in private collections.

Sources

 Adriaen Coorte: A Unique Late 17th Century Dutch Still Life Painter, by Laurens J. Bol, Van Gorkum, 1977
 Adriaen Coorte in the RKD

Coorte